Ricky Yacobi (born Ricky bin Yacub; 12 March 1963 – 21 November 2020) was an Indonesian football player. He usually played as a striker and was one of the most prominent Indonesian footballers of the 1980s. His nickname was the "Indonesian Paul Breitner". He made a name for himself at the 1986 Asian Games when he led the Indonesian national football team. In 1988, Japanese club Matsushita (currently known as Gamba Osaka) bought him, but he failed to make an impact with the team because of the climate and weather conditions. He only played 6 games for the side, scoring one goal.

After retiring, he opened a football school called Sekolah Sepak Bola (SSB) Ricky Yacobi in Jakarta, which he operated. He also served as manager of one of the first Indonesian division clubs, Jakarta Matador FC.

Death 
On 21 November 2020 Yacobi died of a heart attack while playing football with several former national team players and journalists at Senayan A Field, Gelora Bung Karno Sports Complex. One of his teammates said that Yacobi suddenly fell when he was about to celebrate after scoring a goal. He was rushed to the nearby , but to no avail.

Honours

Club
PSMS Medan
 Perserikatan: 1983, 1985

Arseto Solo
 Galatama: 1987
 Galatama-Perserikatan Invitational Championship: 1987

International
Indonesia
 Southeast Asian Games  Gold medal: 1987

Individual
 Galatama top scorers: 1986–87, 1990

References

1963 births
2020 deaths
Sportspeople from Medan
Indonesian footballers
Expatriate footballers in Japan
Indonesian expatriate sportspeople in Japan
PSMS Medan players
Gamba Osaka players
Indonesia international footballers
Indonesian expatriate footballers
Association football forwards
Footballers at the 1986 Asian Games
Southeast Asian Games gold medalists for Indonesia
Southeast Asian Games medalists in football
Competitors at the 1987 Southeast Asian Games
Asian Games competitors for Indonesia
Association football players who died while playing
Sport deaths in Indonesia